was a weekly Japanese TV show featuring Hello! Project members. The series was broadcast on TV Tokyo network and BS-JAPAN from 21 April 2011 to 31 May 2012.

Network & on-air time 
 TV Tokyo (Kantou area and the Eastern district of Shizuoka Prefecture) - Friday 1:00-1:30 (JST)
 Satellite Broadcasting - Saturday 9:30-10:00 (1 day delay)
 Shiga prefecture area - Tuesday 18:25-18:55 (19 days delay)
 Fukuoka prefecture area - Sunday 6:30-7:00 (17 days delay)

External links 
  

Japanese variety television shows
TV Tokyo original programming
2011 Japanese television series debuts
2012 Japanese television series endings
Hello! Project